Waheed Qureshi (Urdu: وحید قریشی) (14 February 1925 – 17 October 2009) was a Pakistani noted linguist, literary critic, writer, researcher, educationalist and scholar of Urdu literature and oriental languages. Waheed Qureshi was one of the foremost scholars who helped shape the mood and colour of research on oriental languages and literature.

Education
Born as Abdul Waheed on 14 February 1925 in Mianwali (now in Pakistan), Dr Waheed Qureshi got his early education in Lahore. He obtained honours degree in Persian in 1944, master's degree in Persian in 1946 and a master's degree in History in 1950 from Government College, Lahore.

From 1947 to 1950, he remained Alfred Patiala Research Scholar at the University of Punjab, Lahore. In 1952, he wrote his thesis "Insha Literature in Persian – A Critical Study" and obtained a PhD degree in classical Persian prose. He wrote another research dissertation on the poet Mir Hasan and his poetry in 1964, and obtained a D.Litt in Urdu as a language.

Being devoted to books since childhood, he began building his personal library when he was a student and had turned it into a sizeable collection of rare Urdu and Persian books and manuscripts before he died.

Career
Waheed Qureshi was appointed lecturer in Oriental College, Punjab University, Lahore in 1963 and he became its university principal in 1980. He worked as dean of Islamic and Oriental Learning for many years. During his tenure at the National Language Authority as its chairman, he got published a large number of research dissertations and technical books and strove for the implementation of Urdu as the official language of Pakistan. Nearly a year after his death in October 2009, Iftikhar Arif who replaced him as chairman, National Language Authority and some other literary critics felt that the struggle for 'Urdu language as the official language of Pakistan' had significantly slowed down after Waheed Qureshi's death.

He entered the literary circles with a bang in late 1940s when he wrote Shibli ki hayat-i-muashaqa, a research work that unearthed the love-life of Shibli Nomani, a renowned Muslim scholar, and tried to portray him as a human in the light of Freudian theories. He psychoanalysed Shibli's personality as reflected in his Persian ghazals and his letters addressed to Atiya Fayzee.

In addition to his two doctoral dissertations, his works that earned him name and respect of his peers were his critical studies, research papers and annotated and edited versions of some classical Urdu and Persian works. Another contribution of his is towards understanding the ideological basis of Pakistan, Pakistan movement and poetry of Iqbal. He remained editor of several literary and research journals, including Saheefa, Iqbal Review and Iqbal for many years. The institutions that benefited from his acumen include Maghribi Pakistan Urdu Academy, Bazm-i-Iqbal and Iqbal Academy Pakistan. He held the charge of Director Iqbal Academy Pakistan from July 1982 to April 1983 in first term and from September 1993 to June 1997 in second term.

He wrote around 30 books. His vast and deep study of oriental literature, acquaintance with the German and French languages and exposure to social sciences helped him create a distinct literary approach and style that beautifully mixed criticism with research.

Dr. Waheed Qureshi was a researcher, critic, poet, teacher, administrator and known as a witty person. One manifestation of his wit was his satirical literary column in Daily Jang, which he wrote with the pseudonym Mir Jumla Lahori. He also gave comic speeches on Radio Pakistan on several occasions.

Awards and recognition
 Niaz Fatehpuri Literary Award (1984)
 Tufail Literary Award (1986)
 Pride of Performance Award by the President of Pakistan (1993)
 Allama Iqbal Award (2003)

Death
Dr. Waheed Qureshi died on 17 October 2009 in Lahore, Pakistan.

Books
Some of his notable publications include:
Ideological foundations of Pakistan
Oriental studies: the Indian, Persian, and other essays
Urdū kā bihtarīn inshāʼī adab : Rajab ʻAlī Beg se daur-i ḥāz̤ir tak, a selection of best Urdu essays, 18th century to date
Dīvān-i Jahān̲dār, edition of the collected poetry of a classical Urdu poet, Javān Bak̲h̲t Jahān̲dār
Armag̲h̲ān-i Īrān ; Maqālāt-i muntak̲h̲abah-yi majallah-yi ṣaḥīfah, on Persian literature
Mut̤ālaʻah-yi Ḥālī
Asāsiyāt-i Iqbāl, scholarly study of the works of Sir Muhammad Iqbal, 1877–1938
Nazr-i Ghālib, 
Qāʼid-i Aʻẓam aur taḥrīk-i Pākistān, on the role played by Mahomed Ali Jinnah, 1876–1948, in the Pakistan movement

References

External links

1925 births
2009 deaths
Directors of Iqbal Academy
Linguists from Pakistan
Pakistani literary critics
Pakistani educational theorists
Pakistani scholars
Urdu-language writers
Recipients of the Pride of Performance
Government College University, Lahore alumni
Academic staff of the University of the Punjab
Iqbal scholars
20th-century linguists